A flower carpet is a carpet made of flowers arranged in patterns. Flower carpet events happen in many places around the world. One of the most popular flower carpet events is the Flower Carpet biennial in Brussels. Flower carpets are made on the occasion of Onam festival in Kerala, India, to welcome the legendary king, Mahabali. The Guinness World Record for the largest flower carpet of the world is for Jardines of Mexico, where an 18,000 m2 flower carpet was made on 8 December 2018. Carpets of live flowers are arranged for the Feast of Corpus Christi in Spycimierz, Klucz, Olszowa, Zalesie Śląskie, Zimna Wódka in Poland. The tradition was inscribed on UNESCO Representative List of the Intangible Cultural Heritage of Humanity in 2021.

Gallery

References

Footnotes

Notes

Floristry
Rugs and carpets